"Will of the People" is a song by British rock band Muse. The title track from their ninth studio album Will of the People, it was released as the third single from the album on 1 June 2022.

Release
"Will of the People" was first announced as the opening song on the track listing for Muse's upcoming ninth studio album, also named Will of the People, through the band's social media channels on 4 April 2022. On 27 May, "Will of the People" was announced through the band's social media channels as the third single to be released from the album, with a release date of 1 June.

Upon its release on 1 June 2022, "Will of the People" was accompanied on social media channels with a quote explaining the backstory of the song and music video, which read as follows:

On the same day as the release of the single, Muse announced a series of seven intimate concerts in small venues across Europe and North America in October 2022, ahead of the Will of the People World Tour.

Writing and composition
"Will of the People" has been described as an "anthemic" glam rock song, also featuring traits of progressive rock. Rhythmically, the song has been compared to "The Beautiful People" by Marilyn Manson and "Summertime Blues" by Eddie Cochran. The song commences with a crowd repeatedly chanting "the will of the people"; this is a feature that is repeated throughout the track, forming both the song's bridge and the backing vocals to the choruses.

Lyrically, the song is an anti-establishment protest song, similarly to previous Muse single "Compliance"; however, in contrast to the gaslighting nature of the previous single attempting to convince the listener that the oppressor is the one in the right, the lyrics of "Will of the People" are from the perspective of the victim, calling for direct action to be taken against the oppressor. The song is intended to be a "populist parody, almost the antithesis to 'Uprising'," another Muse song with a similar anti-establishment theme that instead "[takes] it seriously."

Music video
The music video for "Will of the People" was released on 1 June 2022 at 15:00 BST (UTC+1), the same day as the single was released. The music video for "Will of the People" follows on from the videos for previous singles "Won't Stand Down" and "Compliance", continuing the same themes and following the same characters.

The video, directed and animated by Tom Teller, is set in a dystopian city in which a revolution takes place. The video opens with a person receiving a delivery of a metallic mask, the same as the mask featured in the "Won't Stand Down" and "Compliance" music videos; he is later revealed to be Will the Hacker, the leader of the revolution. As the video progresses, a growing number of revolutionaries advance through the city, destroying security cameras, spraying "Will of the People" logo graffiti onto walls, tearing down statues and attacking the building belonging to the Ministry of Truth, in reference to George Orwell's dystopian novel Nineteen Eighty-Four.

As the Ministry of Truth building explodes and continues to burn, the city's electricity supply and mobile phone signals are shut down in an attempt to smother the revolution. The leaders of the revolution depart the city in futuristic supercars, resembling Tesla Cybertrucks, heading into the desert as the skyline of the city burns behind them. In the desert the revolutionaries find three ancient statues of the faces of band members Matt Bellamy, Dominic Howard and Chris Wolstenholme carved in the style of Mount Rushmore; they are destroyed by being pulled to the ground with cables, before being covered in "Will of the People" logo graffiti. Three members take off their masks, revealing themselves as the members of Muse.

The music video for "Will of the People" references multiple forms of popular culture; as well as Orwell's Nineteen Eighty-Four, the video has been compared to "V for Vendetta set in [the] Blade Runner 2049 universe".

Personnel
Credits adapted from Tidal.

Muse
Matt Bellamy – lead vocals, guitars, composition, production, engineering
Chris Wolstenholme – bass guitar, production, engineering
Dominic Howard – drums, production, engineering

Production
Aleks Von Korff – additional production, engineering
Chris Gehringer – mastering
Serban Ghenea – mixing
Bryce Bordone – mixing engineer
Andy Maxwell – studio assistant
Joe Devenney – studio assistant
Tommy Bosustow – studio assistant
Chris Whitemyer – technical assistant
Paul Warren – technical assistant

Charts

References 

2022 singles
2022 songs
Muse (band) songs
Protest songs
Animated music videos
Songs written by Matt Bellamy